Hendrik Jacobus "Henny" Scholtz (born 30 January 1911 in Amsterdam) was a sailor from the Netherlands, who represented his country at the 1964 Summer Olympics in Enoshima. Scholtz, as crew on the Dutch Dragon took the 13th place with helmsman Wim van Duyl, fellow crew member Jan Jongkind (Race 1 - 4) and Dick Wayboer (Race 5 - 7).

In the 1936 Olympics in Kiel Scholtz was substitute for the Dutch Star who took the Bronze medal. Scholtz was also heavily involved in the preparation of the Dutch Olympic Sailing Team for the 1980 Summer Olympics in Tallinn.

Sources

1911 births
Year of death missing
Place of death missing
Sportspeople from Amsterdam
Dutch male sailors (sport)
Star class sailors
Sailors at the 1964 Summer Olympics – Dragon
Olympic sailors of the Netherlands
Dutch referees and umpires
20th-century Dutch people